Bondi Plus is a prime time discussion TV program that airs every Monday on the Maltese national television station TVM (Malta). The show is presented by renowned journalist Lou Bondi.

The Bondiplus programme originated from the Bondicini investigative journalism programme, which was co-presented by Bondi and former PL candidate Simone Cini in 2001. 

Maltese television shows